Frank Stallworth Lockhart (born April 8, 1903, at Dayton, Ohio – April 25, 1928 at Daytona Beach, Florida) was an American automobile racing driver active in the 1920s, considered by many historians to be a legend in the sport on par with 1960s British World Drivers' Champion Jim Clark. During a "remarkable if all too short" career, Lockhart won numerous races on dirt, board tracks, the 1926 Indianapolis 500, and set a world land speed record for a distance average. In all, he had nine AAA wins and two vice-championships in two years of competition.

Racing career
Lockhart was raised in Southern California. He became a famous West Coast dirt track racer. Lockhart had a strong engineering and motor building ability that he used to build custom cars throughout his career.

1926
Lockhart began his career in Frontenac-prepared Fords (Fronty Fords) at board track racing events, where he showed remarkable speed against the dominating Duesenbergs and Millers for two seasons. His big break came when he was signed as a relief driver for Peter Kreis's eight-cylinder supercharged Miller at the 1926 Indianapolis 500. He convinced Kreis to allow him to take some "warm up" laps, and he clocked quicker times than Kreis (}). He set a new unofficial track record on his first official qualifying lap (a three lap average was used to set a track record). He cut down a tire and crashed on the second qualifying lap. He also had mechanical problems on his second attempt. On race day, he moved from 20th to fifth by Lap 5, having passed 14 cars on that lap alone. He moved up to second on Lap 16. Lockhart took the lead from Dave Lewis shortly after a rain delay on Lap 72. Lewis and Lockhart battled for the lead for the next 20 laps, until Lewis dropped out. Lockhart nearly stretched out a two lap lead before rain ended the race on Lap 160, becoming the fourth rookie to win the Indianapolis 500.

Lockhart bought the car. He later bought a second Miller car, and he set track records almost everywhere he went. He won four more AAA championship events in 1926, and finished second in the standings.

1927
Lockhart's car was the first car equipped with an intercooler. The intercooler added  to his speed at his first race at Culver City in March.

Lockhart qualified on the pole for the 1927 Indianapolis 500 in his Perfect Circle Miller. Lockhart led the opening 81 laps, and a full 107 before his car broke a connecting rod, setting an opening lap-leader record that stood for 64 years. He won five more AAA championship events in 1927, and repeated the vice-championship.

Racing career summary
In his racing career he set the all-time qualifying speed record at Atlantic City, a record first exceeded at Indianapolis in 1960. He raced at 22 board track events in his career, with eight wins and fourteen Top 5 finishes, and is 25th on the all-time lap leader board at Indianapolis.

Land speed record and death

On Lockhart's return pass the Black Hawk Special right rear tire exploded due to a blister which had formed during his first pass at speed, went out of control and tumbled violently across the sand, throwing Lockhart from the car and killing him instantly.

Indianapolis 500 results

Awards
Lockhart was inducted in the Indianapolis Motor Speedway Hall of Fame in 1965.
He was inducted in the National Sprint Car Hall of Fame in the first class in 1990.
He was inducted in the Motorsports Hall of Fame of America in 1999.

References

racemaker.com
Biography
Biography
Biography

Racing drivers who died while racing
1903 births
1928 deaths
Indianapolis 500 drivers
Indianapolis 500 polesitters
Indianapolis 500 winners
Land speed record people
National Sprint Car Hall of Fame inductees
Sportspeople from Cleveland
Sports deaths in Florida
Filmed deaths in motorsport
AAA Championship Car drivers
Racing drivers from Dayton, Ohio